Ogeu-les-Bains is a commune in the Pyrénées-Atlantiques department in south-western France. Ogeu-les-Bains station has rail connections to Pau, Oloron-Sainte-Marie and Bedous.

See also
Communes of the Pyrénées-Atlantiques department

References

Communes of Pyrénées-Atlantiques